Charlot Kaské (fl. 1763–1765) was a Shawnee war chief during Pontiac's War. Kaské's personal details were unusual for a Shawnee chief: he was a Catholic, his father was German, and his wife was an English captive brought up among the Shawnees. 

Kaské initially participated in the war, which was an effort to prevent the British from occupying the Illinois Country, as an ally of Pontiac. As the war progressed and went badly for the American Indians, Pontiac began to negotiate with the British. Kaské remained firmly anti-British, however, and eventually left British territory by crossing the Mississippi River with other French and Indian refugees rather than accept British rule.

References
Dixon, David. Never Come to Peace Again: Pontiac's Uprising and the Fate of the British Empire in North America. Norman: University of Oklahoma Press, 2005. .
Dowd, Gregory Evans. War under Heaven: Pontiac, the Indian Nations, & the British Empire. Baltimore: Johns Hopkins University Press, 2002. ,  (paperback).
White, Richard. The Middle Ground: Indians, Empires, and Republics in the Great Lakes Region, 1650–1815. Cambridge University Press, 1991. .

Native American leaders
Indigenous people of Pontiac's War
18th-century Shawnee people

Year of death unknown
Year of birth unknown